François André Dulysse (born April 13, 1999) is a professional footballer who plays as a defender for Central Valley Fuego FC in USL League One. Born in the United States, he represents the Haiti national team.

Career

Youth, College & Amateur
Dulysse played with USSDA side Boca United in Florida, before spending time with Portland Timbers in 2016 whilst graduating from Beaverton High School.

In 2016, Dulysse played college soccer at the University of Central Florida, where he went on to make 23 appearances for the Knights over three seasons. In 2019, Dulysse transferred to Manhattan College and went on to play 15 games for the Jaspers. He missed a full senior year due to the COVID-19 pandemic.

Whilst at college, Dulysse played with USL League Two side Portland Timbers U23s in 2018, and  Treasure Coast Tritons in 2019.

Professional
On December 9, 2020, it was announced that Dulysse had signed with USL League One side New England Revolution II ahead of their 2021 season. On January 21, 2021, Dulysse was drafted 51st overall in the 2021 MLS SuperDraft by New England Revolution, securing his MLS rights should be signed to the club's first team roster.

On April 10, 2021, Dulysse made his professional debut, starting against Fort Lauderdale CF. Dulysse was not announced as a returning player for the club's 2022 season where they'd be competing in the newly formed MLS Next Pro.

Dulysse signed with Central Valley Fuego in February 2022, ahead of their inaugural season in USL League One.

International
Dulysse has represented the Haiti national football team at U20 and U23 level. He was called up to represent the senior Haiti national team at the 2021 CONCACAF Gold Cup. He debuted with Haiti in a Gold Cup match against Canada on 15 July 2021.

Personal
Dulysse was born in Lexington, Kentucky, but moved to Greenacres, Florida at the age of two.

References

External links
Francois Dulysse - 2018 - (M) Soccer UCF Athletics
Francois Dulysse - Men's Soccer Manhattan College Athletics

1999 births
Living people
People from Greenacres, Florida
Soccer players from Florida
Haitian footballers
Haiti international footballers
Haiti under-20 international footballers
American soccer players
American people of Haitian descent
Association football defenders
Haitian expatriate footballers
New England Revolution draft picks
New England Revolution II players
Portland Timbers U23s players
Treasure Coast Tritons players
UCF Knights men's soccer players
Central Valley Fuego FC players
USL League One players
USL League Two players
2021 CONCACAF Gold Cup players